Jason Myles Goss (born July 25, 1981) is an American singer-songwriter.

Biography
Goss lives in Brooklyn, but is originally from Hopedale, Massachusetts. He has self-released five albums to date and a live EP. Goss's noteworthy appearances include an entry in the 2003 Newport Folk Festival's Songwriter Contest, in which he finished as one of five finalists. He cites Gillian Welch, Josh Ritter, Elliott Smith, and David Gray as contemporary influences, and Bob Dylan as a lifelong, major influence.

Goss began writing and performing solo songs at Oberlin College, where he studied as an undergraduate before moving to Brooklyn to focus on his solo career.

Discography

Albums
 Long Way Down (2003), self-released
 Another Ghost (2005), self-released
 A Plea For Dreamland (2009), self-released
 Radio Dial (2012), self-released
 This Town Is Only Going To Break Your Heart (2015), self-released

EPs
  A Plea For Dreamland, 2007

References

External links

Interview on Breakthru Radio

1981 births
American male singer-songwriters
Folk musicians from Massachusetts
Living people
Musicians from Brooklyn
Oberlin College alumni
People from Hopedale, Massachusetts
Singer-songwriters from Massachusetts
Singers from New York City
21st-century American singers
21st-century American male singers
Singer-songwriters from New York (state)